"The One I Love" is a song by Scottish rock band Big Country, which was released in 1993 as the third and final single from their sixth studio album The Buffalo Skinners. It was written by Stuart Adamson and Bruce Watson, and produced by Big Country.

"The One I Love" was released in the United States only, although a potential UK and European release was considered. The song generated major airplay across the States. It reached No. 17 on the Billboard Modern Rock Tracks, No. 34 on the Billboard Album Rock Tracks, and No. 13 on the Gavin Report's "Gavin Album" chart.

In 2004, Watson recalled of the song: "It was originally demoed in my home studio in Charlestown. It was a case of me having the intro and the verse worked out and Stuart having the chorus and the middle 8 worked out. A lot of Big Country songs were bolted together and this song is a prime example."

Reception
Upon release, Larry Flick of Billboard described the song as an "urgent, anthemic ditty" which "marks a welcome and surprisingly potent return for the band". He added: "Adamson's voice is in top shape, and the production is forceful without flying over the edge into melodrama." In a review of The Buffalo Skinners, Kim DeFalco of The Tampa Tribune commented: "Adamson burrows into his own psyche for moody, bluesy songs of alienation such as "The One I Love"." Dick Hogan of The Gazette wrote: "It opens with a mellow touch before breaking into layered guitars and features a catchy, multi-track sing-along hook."

Roberto Gonzalez of the Hartford Courant considered the song "undeniably catchy" but reminiscent of the band's 1983 hit "In a Big Country". John Everson of the Southtown Star commented: "Singles like "Alone" and "The One I Love" should have no trouble finding an FM home". Johnny Loftus of AllMusic noted: "...the strength of "Seven Waves" and "One I Love"'s choruses is so pure and honest, it's hard not to get butterflies in the bridge."

Track listing
Cassette single
"The One I Love" - 5:03
"The Selling of America" - 4:20

CD single (promo)
"The One I Love" (Edit) - 4:00
"The One I Love" (Remix) - 4:03
"The One I Love" (Album Version) - 5:03

Charts

Personnel
Big Country
 Stuart Adamson - vocals, guitar
 Bruce Watson - guitar
 Tony Butler - bass, backing vocals

Additional musicians
 Simon Phillips - drums

Production
 Big Country - producers
 Dave Bascombe - mixing
 Chris Sheldon - recording
 George Marino - mastering
 Dave Thoener - remix, edits
 Mark Eichner - edits

Other
 Amy Wenzler - design
 Jacqueline Murphy - art direction

References

1993 songs
1993 singles
Big Country songs
Songs written by Stuart Adamson